June Jordan School for Equity is a small public high school located in the Excelsior District of San Francisco, California. The school is named after writer and activist June Jordan, whom Alice Walker called "the universal poet."

June Jordan School for Equity is a part of a nationwide small schools movement, with its parents and staff organized soon after the school was formed to work in helping SFUSD pass a district-wide Small Schools Policy.

Mission
JJSE’s mission is to prepare a diverse group of urban youth to be:

Community: community members who show respect, integrity, courage, and humility

Social Justice: agents of change in their school, their neighborhoods, and the world

Independent Thinkers: intellectuals with the skills necessary to succeed in college and life

History
June Jordan School for Equity was founded in 2003 by Small Schools for Equity (SSE), a non-profit organization formed by a group of teachers, parents, and students who believed that San Francisco needed a new and innovative model of schooling.

For two years before the school opened, the school’s founders studied successful urban schools across the country and worked with the San Francisco Organizing Project to cultivate a broad-based community organizing effort, through which the San Francisco Unified School District agreed to put forth a request for proposals for new and redesigned schools. SSE applied in partnership with San Francisco State University’s College of Education and was selected from among 30 applicants to open the new school.

In August 2003, the new school opened with a ninth grade class at a temporary location on the campus of San Francisco State University, as the first high school to enjoy a formal partnership with a California State University. A year later, June Jordan School for Equity (a name chosen by the student body during the school’s first year) moves to its current location at the former Luther Burbank Middle School campus in the Excelsior District.

In November 2005, facing severe budget cuts, SFUSD places JJSE on a list of schools that may be closed due to low enrollment, despite the fact that it is a small school by design. JJSE parents work with SFOP to support an event at Mission High School where over 1,300 people hear Mayor Gavin Newsom and school board members pledge to take JJSE off the closure list and work to pass a small schools policy.

In June 2007, JJSE graduated its first class; 73% of graduates are admitted to four-year universities, compared to less than 50% nationwide.

Demographics
JJSE’s student body of about 250 students lives primarily in San Francisco’s southeast neighborhoods, where young people confront powerful socio-economic obstacles to academic success. These neighborhoods—the Excelsior, Visitacion Valley, Bayview/Hunters Point, and the Mission—are all working-class and low-income, with some of the highest concentrations of families with children in the city. At the same time, many of these communities are experiencing rapid gentrification, which is forcing long-time residents to leave the city and undermining community-based efforts to stem rising crime and violence.

 June Jordan School For Equity
Latino - 46%
Black - 33%
Chinese - 6%
Filipino - 6%
White - 4%
Other - 7%

 All SFUSD High Schools
Latino - 23%
Black - 10%
Chinese - 33%
White - 11%
Other - 10%
Filipino - 6%
American Indian - 1%
Japanese - 1%
Korean - 1%

School design
In order to meet the needs of low-skilled, marginalized students, JJSE has implemented a number of research-based program features as a small, redesigned school, including:

class size of 25 or less
core teacher pupil load of 100 or less
an advisory system, including frequent parent contact
all students take a-g university entrance requirements
partnerships with local colleges where students take university courses
a performance assessment (portfolio) system to create public accountability for student achievement
democratic decision-making and distributed staff leadership
significant built-in weekly professional development and staff collaboration time
a Wellness Center to address mental and physical health needs
a parent organizing committee to promote parent leadership and community-based accountability

Pedagogy
As a school for social justice serving a largely working-class, Latino and African-American student population, the mission of June Jordan School for Equity is not just to prepare students for college, but also to prepare its graduates to be agents of positive change in the world.

Its pedagogy is expressly designed to help its students understand the forces of marginalization they have experienced growing up, and thus to begin the process of freeing themselves from oppression, including especially the internalized oppression (or self-imposed limits) which  prevent so many students from meeting their potential.

JJSE is in the process of clearly defining its pedagogy in order to support JJSE teachers on their path to becoming masters at the art of teaching for social justice, which in turn will provide all JJSE students the opportunity to develop the self-confidence and self-discipline they need to become not just authentic intellectuals, but also leaders who will work on behalf of their communities and create a more just and humane world.

References

External links
June Jordan School for Equity

Educational institutions established in 2003
High schools in San Francisco
Public high schools in California
2003 establishments in California